The 1994–95 Maryland Terrapins Men's Basketball Team represented the University of Maryland in the 1994–95 season. Led by head coach Gary Williams, the Terrapins had their one of their first majorly successful seasons under Williams. This season is regarded as one of the first stepping stones to establishing the Terps as the national powerhouse that they would eventually become. This season, they shared the ACC regular season title, and even though they improved on their previous seasons' record of 18–12, they matched their postseason result of the previous year making it to the NCAA's Sweet Sixteen.

Roster

Tournament results
ACC Tournament
Quarterfinals Vs. Florida State - W, 71-64 @ Greensboro Coliseum, Greensboro, NC
Semifinals Vs. North Carolina - L, 92-97 OT @ Greensboro Coliseum, Greensboro, NC
NCAA Tournament
First Round Vs. Gonzaga - W, 87-63 @ Jon M. Huntsman Center, Salt Lake City, UT
Round of 32 Vs. Texas - W, 82-68 @ Jon M. Huntsman Center, Salt Lake City, UT
Sweet Sixteen Vs. Connecticut - L, 89-99 @ Oracle Arena, Oakland, CA

Rankings

Awards and honors
Joe Smith  National Player of the Year, Consensus First-team All-American, ACC Player of the Year

References

Maryland Terrapins men's basketball seasons
Maryland
Maryland
1994 in sports in Maryland
1995 in sports in Maryland